The Delacorte Theater is a 1,800-seat open-air theater in Central Park, in the New York City borough of Manhattan. It is home to the Public Theater's free Shakespeare in the Park productions.

Over five million people have attended more than 150 free productions of Shakespeare and other classical works and musicals at the Delacorte Theater since its opening in 1962.

History
The theater is named in honor of Valerie and George T. Delacorte Jr., who donated money for its establishment, after several seasons presented by Joseph Papp's Shakespeare Workshop (founded in 1954) had been touring New York's boroughs on temporary staging and had proved the venture worthwhile. Papp had started seeking funds in 1958 for a permanent outdoor amphitheater in Central Park, under the aegis of Helen Hayes.

The first production at the theater in 1962 was The Merchant of Venice starring George C. Scott and James Earl Jones.

In 2012 the Public celebrated the 50th anniversary of the Delacorte with a one-night only reading of Romeo and Juliet starring numerous past performers. Meryl Streep and Kevin Kline read the lead roles and were supported by Phylicia Rashad, Sam Waterston, Sandra Oh, Bill Irwin, Christine Baranski, John Cullum, Raúl Esparza, Jesse L. Martin, Jerry Stiller, Christopher Walken, David Harbour, and others.

Planned renovation
In 2018, the Public announced plans for the first major renovation of the Delacorte. Bjarke Ingels Group was selected as the architect. The New York City Landmarks Preservation Commission approved the plans in January 2022.

References

External links

Shakespeare in the Park Official Website

1962 establishments in New York City
Central Park
Theatres completed in 1962
Theatres in Manhattan
Outdoor theatres